Abu'l-Qasim Unujur ibn al-Ikhshid was the second ruler of the Ikhshidid dynasty, which ruled Egypt, Syria and the Hejaz under the suzerainty of the Abbasid Caliphate but de facto autonomous. Unujur ruled from 946 to 960, but much of the actual power was held by the black eunuch Abu'l-Misk Kafur.

Unujur died in 960 CE, and was buried in Jerusalem next to his father, at a location close to the Gate of the Tribes on the Temple Mount.

References

Sources
 

961 deaths
Year of birth unknown
Ikhshidids
10th-century rulers in Africa
10th-century rulers in Asia
Ikhshidid emirs